Chandrashekhar Gadgil was an Indian playback singer of the Marathi Cinema and Hindi Cinema. He has sung a lot of songs for R.D. Burman. He has written a famous book Shaapit Gandharva. He started his career as a orchestra singer and then became playback singer
Brother = Sudhir Gadgil and Surendra Gadgil

Discography in films
 Zunj (1975) (Famous Marathi Songs as "Nisaragraja Aik Sangato" & "Kon Hotis Tu Kay Zalis Tu")
 Paradh 
 Navare Sagale Gadhav 
 Ashtvinayak 
 Nate Jadale Don Jivanche 
 Devkinandan Gopala 
 Pandoba Porgi Fasali 
 Kudrat 
 Padarachya Savalit 
 Are Sansar Sansar 
 Janaki
 Rajmata
 Ashanti (1982 film) Shakti de ma''

References

Marathi people
1947 births
Indian male playback singers
Singers from Mumbai
Marathi-language singers
Marathi playback singers
2014 deaths